The chestnut-capped warbler (Basileuterus delattrii) is a New World warbler native from Guatemala to Venezuela. It was split from the rufous-capped warbler (Basileuterus rufifrons) as a distinct species by the IOC in 2021.

References

chestnut-capped warbler
chestnut-capped warbler
Birds of Central America
Birds of Colombia
chestnut-capped warbler
chestnut-capped warbler